Tycho Brahe is a crater on Mars named after the Danish astronomer Tycho Brahe (1546–1601). It is located in the Cerberus hemisphere around 49.8° south and 213.9° west, in an area which is south of the Martz crater and east of the Hellas Basin. The name was adopted by IAU's Working Group for Planetary System Nomenclature in 1973.

References 

Impact craters on Mars
Crater
Eridania quadrangle